= The Monument of Peace and Tolerance =

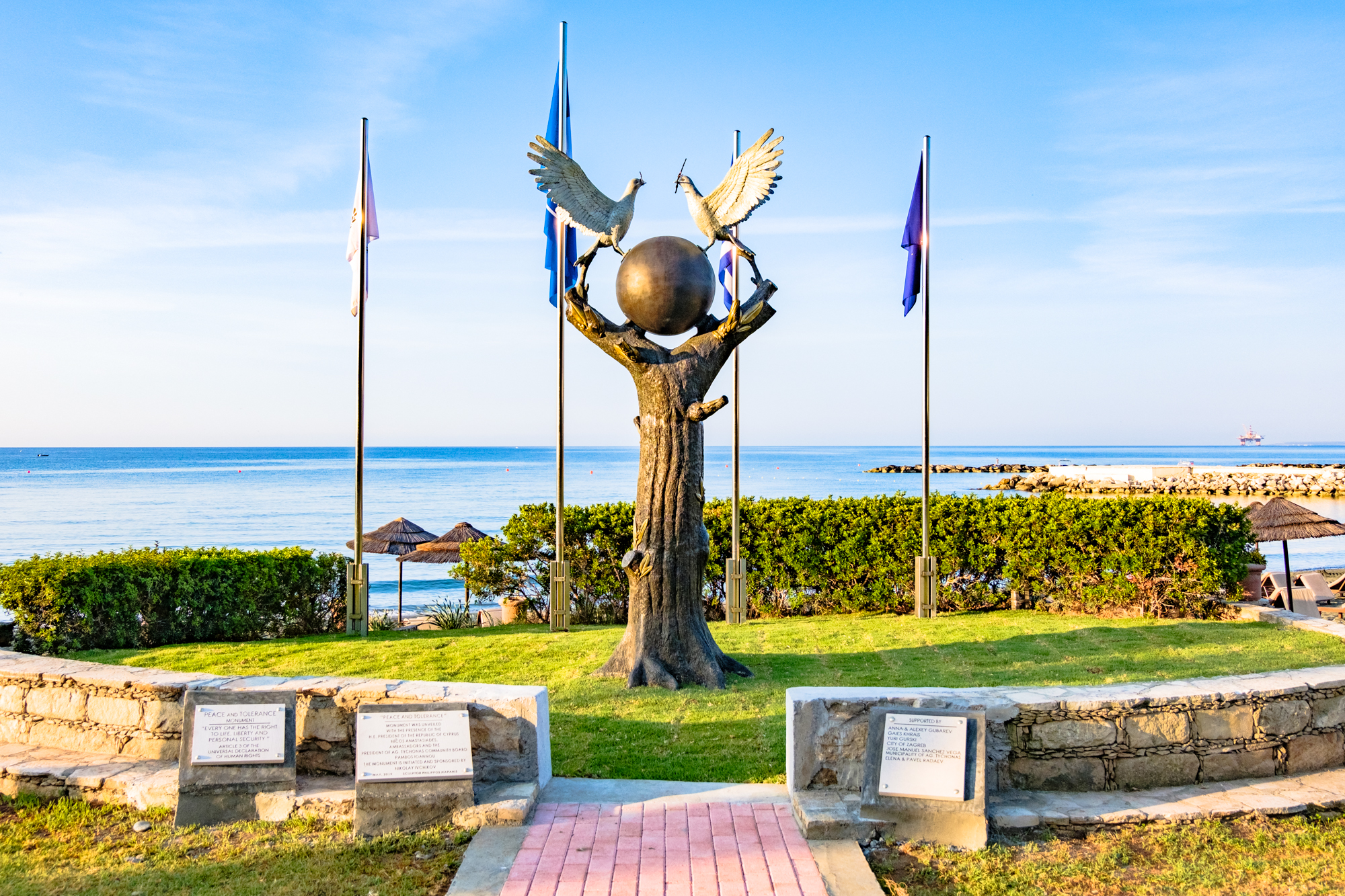
- Artist: Philippos Yiapanis
- Year: 2019
- Type: Sculpture
- Medium: bronze
- Location: Limassol, Cyprus; 34.708527°N 33.130328°E

The Monument of Peace and Tolerance — a bronze sculpture in the form of an olive tree trunk surmounted by a globe and two doves symbolizing peace and tolerance. The monument embodies the idea of humanism and commitment to peace, as well as the core principle of the Universal Declaration of Human Rights: «Everyone has the right to life, liberty and security of person.» The sculpture is located on the Mediterranean coast in Limassol, Cyprus.

== History ==
The monument was created by renowned Cypriot sculptor Philippos Yiapanis and was unveiled on 18 May 2019. The opening ceremony was addressed by Nicos Anastasiades, President of the Republic of Cyprus; Stanislav Viliorovich Osadchiy, Ambassador of the Russian Federation to Cyprus; sculptor Philippos Yiapanis and Russian businessman Nikolay Ivchikov, who initiated and organized the monument's construction. Three English-language plaques are installed at the base of the monument. One plaque contains a quotation from Article 3 of the Universal Declaration of Human Rights, a second provides a description of the monument, and a third lists individuals and organizations that contributed to its funding:

- Anna and Alexey Gubarev
- Gaies Khrais
- Yuri Gurski
- Jose Manuel Sanchez Vega
- Elena and Pavel Radaev.
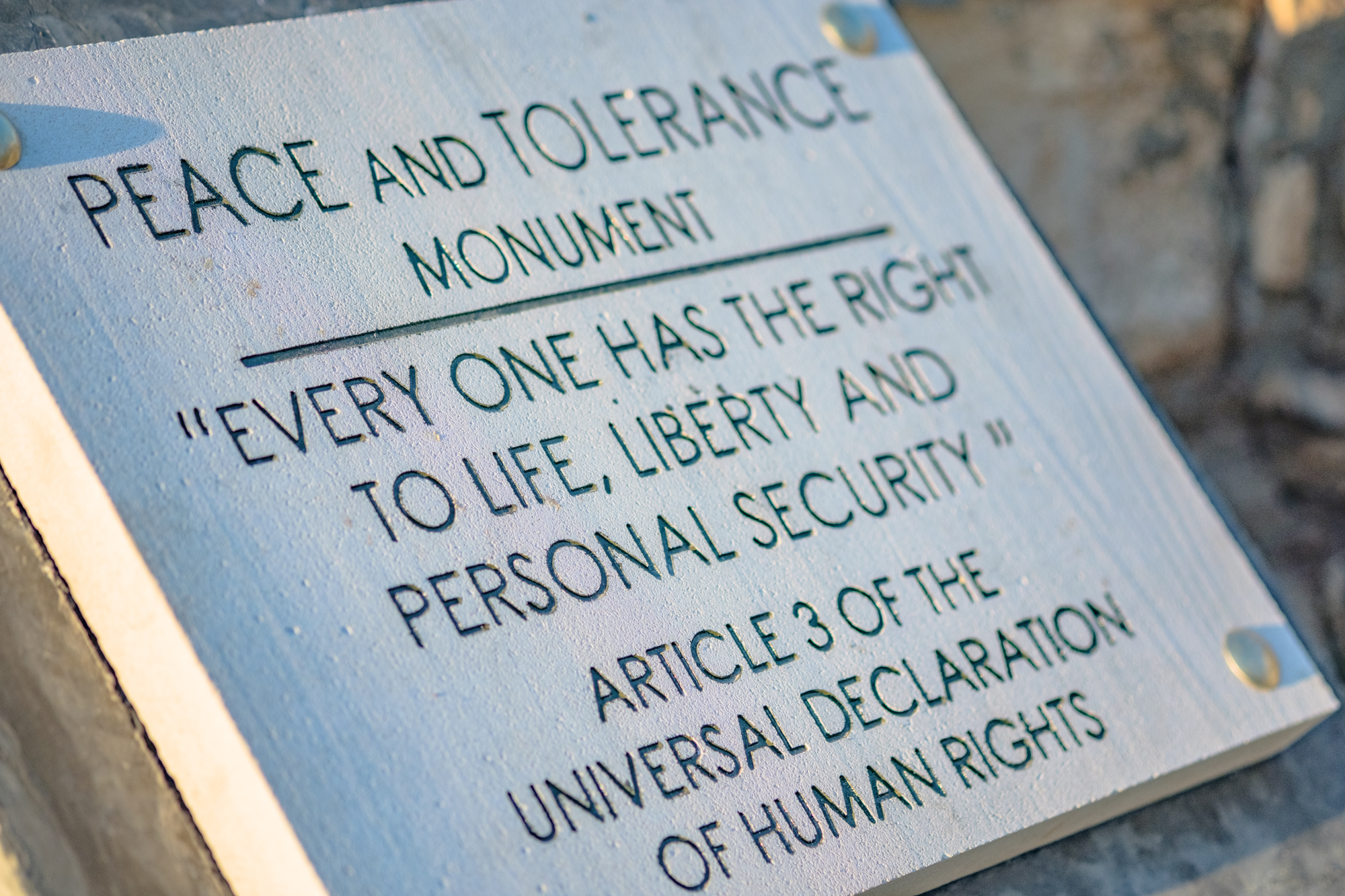

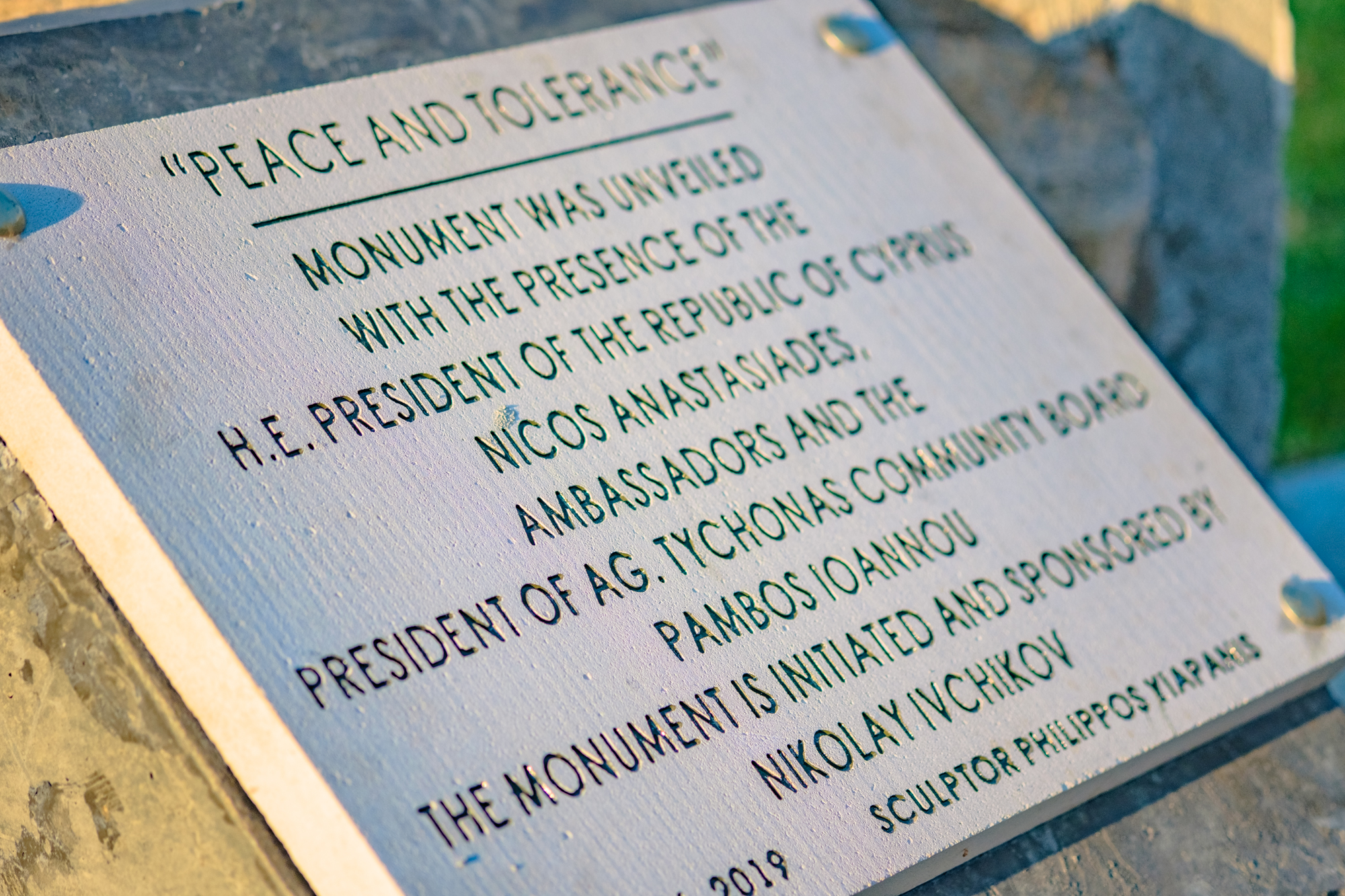

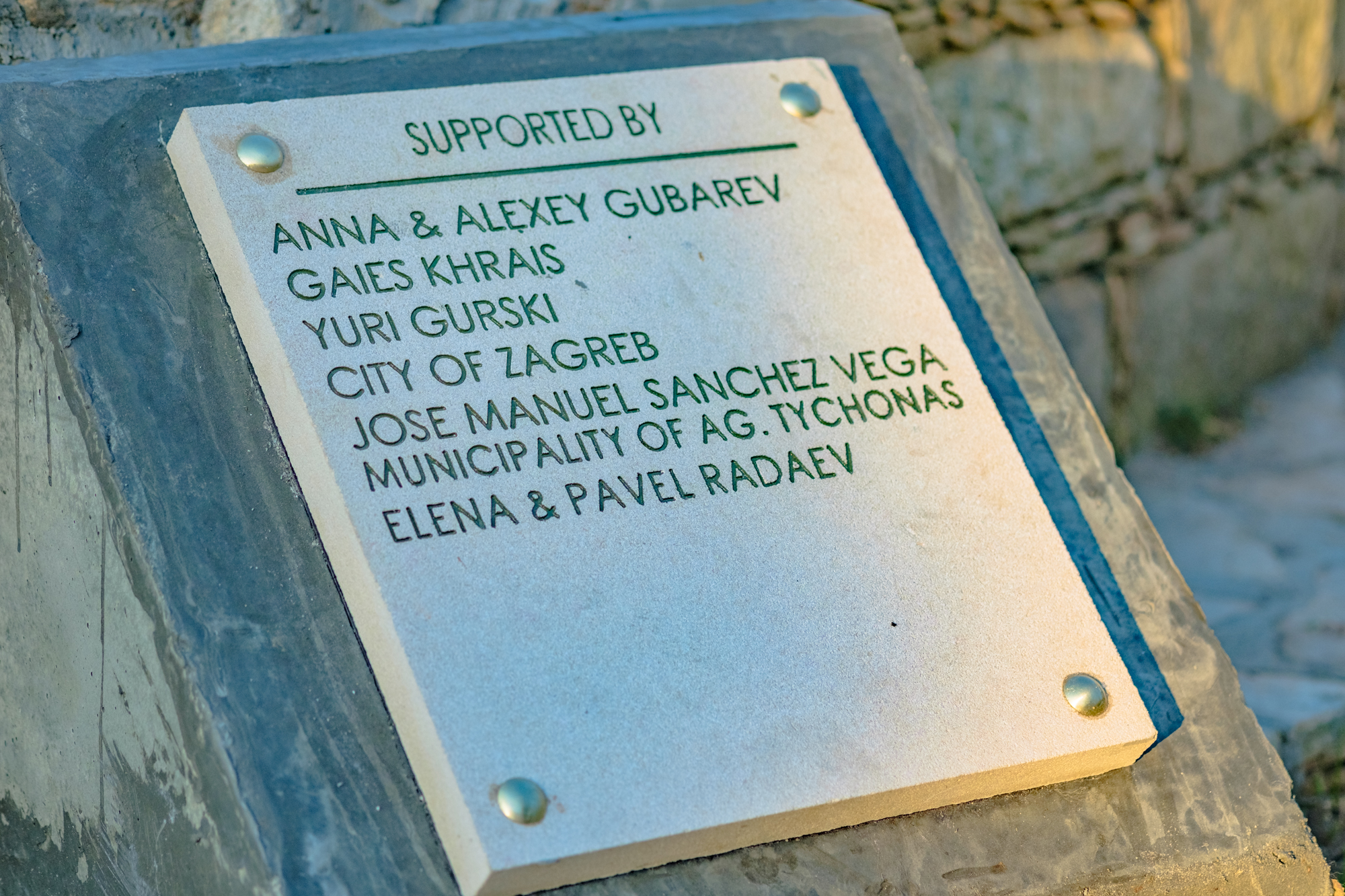
